Václav Havel was the first President of the Czech Republic.

Václav Havel may also refer to:
Václav Havel (canoeist), Olympic canoe medallist for Czechoslovakia
V. J. Havel (Václav J. Havel), a Czech mathematician
Václav Maria Havel, businessman and father of Václav Havel